Schinopsis heterophylla, the quebracho colorado mestizo, is a South American tree species in the genus Schinopsis. It is native to the Gran Chaco region of Paraguay and northeastern Argentina.

References

heterophylla
Trees of South America
Flora of Argentina
Flora of Paraguay
Gran Chaco